José Eusebio Otálora Martínez was a Colombian statesman and General who became President of the United States of Colombia in 1882 in his capacity as the Second Presidential Designate following the death of President Francisco Javier Zaldúa, and the non-acceptance of the office by the First Designate Rafael Núñez.

Biographic data 
Otálora was born in Fomeque, Cundinamarca, on December 16, 1826, and died from a heart attack in Tocaima, Cundinamarca, on April 1, 1884.
He was the second Colombia to die office.

References

1826 births
1885 deaths
Colombian diplomats
Colombian educators
Colombian governors
Colombian generals
Colombian people of Basque descent
Colombian people of Spanish descent
Colombian Liberal Party politicians
Presidents of Colombia
Presidential Designates of Colombia
19th-century Colombian lawyers